The Little Avon River is a small river partly in southern Gloucestershire and partly in South Gloucestershire. For much of its length it forms the boundary between the county of Gloucestershire and the unitary authority of South Gloucestershire. It rises to the east of Wickwar, near Horton, passes near Charfield, Stone and Berkeley, and enters the River Severn via Berkeley Pill. It was formerly navigable up to moorings at Berkeley, but a flood-prevention scheme, built in the 1960s, now prevents navigation more than a few hundred metres upstream.

Geology
The river runs through sandstone and clay, while the source water has been affected by the limestone from where it rises. The river starts as a steep course, with a natural riffle-pool sequence, before flattening out at Stone, where the river has been modified for used for irrigation. By the time the river reaches Berkeley, it is sheltered from the tide using tidal gates.

Its tributaries include Ozleworth Brook, Dyers Brook through Wotton-under-Edge, Doverte Brook and Kilcott Brook.

Ecology
Rare species of conservation interest including white-clawed crayfish, water voles, bullheads and eels are known to live in the catchment. Ten species from the UK Biodiversity Action Plan have been recorded, as well as several from the IUCN Red List.

The river is used as a fishery, controlled by Berkeley Estate Fishing Syndicate, which ensures that brown trout and grayling are in the river for fly fishing as well as standard coarse fishing species.

Notable features

There is a footbridge over the Little Avon River which links Berkeley Castle to Berkeley Stables. The bridge was designated Grade II listed status on 9 September 1985.

References

External links

 Gloucestershire Wildlife Trust
 Natural England (SSSI information)

Tributaries of the River Severn
Rivers of Gloucestershire
South Gloucestershire District
1LittleAvon